Warren Scott Dungan (September 17, 1822 – May 9, 1913) was an American politician and lawyer.

Born in Frankfort Springs, Pennsylvania, Dungan studied law and was admitted to the bar in Pennsylvania. He then moved to Chariton, Iowa, where he practiced law. Dungan served in the Union Army during the American Civil War. He also served in both houses of the Iowa General Assembly and as Lieutenant Governor of Iowa. Dungan died in Chariton, Iowa.

References

1822 births
1913 deaths
People from Beaver County, Pennsylvania
People from Chariton, Iowa
People of Iowa in the American Civil War
Members of the Iowa House of Representatives
Iowa state senators
Lieutenant Governors of Iowa
19th-century American politicians